Pound per hour is a mass flow unit. It is abbreviated as PPH or more conventionally as lb/h. Fuel flow for engines is usually expressed using this unit. It is particularly useful when dealing with gases or liquids, as volume flow varies more with temperature and pressure.

In the US utility industry, steam and water flows throughout turbine cycles are typically expressed in PPH, while in Europe these mass flows are usually expressed in metric tonnes per hour:

1 lb/h = 0.4535927 kg/h = 126.00 mg/s

Minimum fuel intake on a jumbo jet can be as low as 150 lb/h when idling; however, this is not enough to sustain flight.

Units of flow